Investigations Police of Chile (PDI) are the civilian police of Chile. Founded in 1933, it is one of two Chilean police bodies, along with the law enforcement police: Carabineros de Chile. The PDI is the principal law enforcement arm of the Public Ministry of Chile in criminal investigation.

History

19th century
The first reference to police work in Chile is in the Police Regulation of 1803, where the terms "high police" and "public security" are used. Then, in 1830, the Vigilantes and Serenos Corps of Santiago were created, whose work was followed throughout the country. In 1852 the Brigada de Policía was created in Santiago, where the Vigilantes and Serenos Corps were merged.

In the 1870s , the mayor of the city of Santiago, Benjamín Vicuña Mackenna proposed modelling the Brigada de Policía on the Agent de la Sûrete in Paris, France, which was based on the administrative structure of the police force. Ranks of  Inspector, Comisario, and Prefecto (based on the French ranks of Inspecteur, Commissaire, and Préfet) were implemented, and that are still used today.

20th century 
The modern Investigations Police was established in 1933 as a separate organization of civil police, independent from the control of the militarized Carabineros de Chile.

Organization
The Investigative Police divides its investigation areas according to the crime investigated, counting with it several specialized units of police investigation, which have Detectives specialists, experts and experts in the respective areas.

National Headquarters of Crimes Against Human Rights and People
(JENADEP)
Homicide Brigade (BH)
Missing Persons Brigade (BRIUP)
Investigative Brigade of Crimes against Human Rights (BRIDEHU)
Department of Forensic Medicine (DEMECRI)

National Headquarters of Immigration and International Policing
(JENAEX)
Department of Immigration and International Police (POLINT)
Department of Immigration and International Airport Police (POLINT AEROPUERTO)
Department of Secondary Airport Inspection (DEINSA)
Investigative Brigade of Human Trafficking (BRITRAP)

National Headquarters against Robberies and Criminal Areas
(JENACROF)
Robbery Investigative Brigade (BIRO)
Brigade of Criminal Investigation and Police Intervention (BICRIMPOL)

National Headquarters of Crimes against the family
(JENAFAM) 
Investigative Brigade of Sexual and Minor Crimes (BRISEXME)
Institute of Criminology (INSCRIM)
Community Support and Action Department (DACOM)

National Headquarters of Police Intelligence
(JENAIPOL)
Police Intelligence Brigade (BIP)
Special Police Investigations Brigade (BIPE)

National Headquarters of Economic and Environmental Crimes 
(JENADEM)
Investigative Brigade of Economic Crimes (BRIDEC)
Cybercrime Investigative Brigade (BRICIB)
Investigative Brigade of Crimes against the Environment and Cultural Heritage (BIDEMA)
Investigative Brigade of Official Crimes (BRIDEF)
Investigative Brigade of Intellectual Property Crimes (BRIDEPI)
Investigative Brigade of Crimes in Port Premises (BRIDERPO)

National Headquarters of Counternarcotics and Anti-Organized Crime
(JENANCO)
Anti-Narcotics Brigade (BRIANT) in Santiago, and Anti-Narcotics and Anti-Organized Crime Brigades (BRIANCO) in Regions
Investigative Brigade of Organized Crime (BRICO)
Investigating Brigade of Money Laundering (BRILAC)
Canine Training Brigade (BRIACAN)
Air Policing Brigade (BAP)
Metropolitan Tactical Reaction Brigade (BRTM), and Tactical Reaction Teams (ERTA) in Regions
Underwater Operations Team (EOS)
High Risk Vertical Work Team (ETVAR)

National Headquarters of Criminalistics
(JENACRIM)
Criminalistics Laboratory (LACRIM)
Technical Advisory Department (ASETEC)

Criminal Investigation Brigades and others 
Criminal Investigation Brigades (BICRIM)
Zero Microtrace Equipment (MT0)
National Center for Criminal Analysis (CENACRIM)
Criminal Analysis Offices (OFAN)
Police Information Center (CIPOL)
Interpol National Central Office (OCN INTERPOL)
Department of Protection of Important Persons (DPPI)
National Congress Brigade (BRICONA)
Presidential Brigade La Moneda (BRIPEMO)

See also
Carabineros de Chile
Chilean Gendarmerie
Crime in Chile

References

External links
Official website 

1933 establishments in Chile
Government agencies established in 1933
1933 in Chilean law
National law enforcement agencies of Chile